Louis Liebe (1819–1900) was a German conductor and composer who was a pupil of Louis Spohr. He was born in  Magdeburg and became musical director at Worms. One of his pupils was Friedrich Gernsheim. He died in  Chur.

1819 births
1900 deaths
19th-century German composers
People from Worms, Germany

Siehe
Neue Berliner Musikzeitung hrsgg. v. Gustav Bock, 6. Jg., Nr. 37 v. 1852-09-22, S. 295, Sp. 1: Louis Liebe (1819–1900), Musikdirektor in Straßburg; „Louis Liebe, welchem vor Kurzem der Preis für die beste Composition als Männer-Quartett des Gedichtes: ‚Muttersprache‘ von Max von Schenkendorf, von einer Gesellschaft in Mannheim zuerkannt worden war, ist eben wieder als Sieger bei einer Preisbewerbung hervorgegangen.“ (in „Nanzi“; sic Nancy) …
Spohr -  ansicht Personen (spohr-briefe.de) Friedrich Eduard Ludwig (Louis) Liebe, * Magdeburg 26.11.1819, † Chur 04.07.1900
www.Jung-Stilling-Forschung.de